Chenghua Gu is a Professor of Neurobiology at the Harvard Medical School where her research focuses on the Blood–brain barrier. She is also part of the Harvard Brain Science Initiative and has won numerous awards for her groundbreaking research on the brain's vascular component.

Education 
Gu earned her Ph.D. at Cornell Medical School. She then joined the lab of David Ginty at the Johns Hopkins University School of Medicine where she studied the role of semaphorin signaling in vascular development.

Research 
Gu's research focuses on the development of the blood-brain barrier and its interaction with neuronal networks. She uses experimental techniques such as Two-photon excitation microscopy, mouse genetics and computational models to study neurovascular coupling, the regulation of blood flow by changes in neuronal activity, and vascular patterning. Her laboratory has recently published on the importance of the inhibition of transcytosis for maintaining blood-brain barrier integrity and how the mechanisms regulating transcytosis levels could be manipulated to aid the entry of therapeutics into the central nervous system.

Award and honors 
 Allen Distinguished Investigator Award, 2018
 Howard Hughes Medical Institute Faculty Scholar, 2016
 National Institutes of Health Director's Pioneer Award, 2014
 Alfred P. Sloan Research Fellowship, 2008
 Whitehall Foundation Award, 2007
 Klingenstein Fellowship Award, 2007
 March of Dimes Foundation Award, 2007

References

External links 
 https://gu.hms.harvard.edu/

Year of birth missing (living people)
Living people
Weill Cornell Medical College alumni
Harvard Medical School faculty
American women neuroscientists
American neuroscientists